Ryan Hegarty (born 3 June 1976) is a Scottish former footballer who played as a midfielder for Dunfermline Athletic and Livingston.

Career

Playing career
Hegarty was a product of the Dundee United youth academy. He played for the Arabs in several friendly games, but left the club in 1995 without making a competitive appearance.

Following his departure from Tannadice Park, Hegarty signed for Dunfermline Athletic, where his father Kevin had played in the 1970s and 80s. He made 9 appearances for the Pars and scored once.

In 1997, Hegarty was on the move again and signed for Livingston.  Injury was to delay his first appearance for the club. After four months on the sidelines, he came on as a substitute to make his debut for Livi in a 2–0 defeat against Clyde. His injury problems proved to be a hurdle he could not overcome and was forced to retire at the age of 22 after a specialist examination revealed a stress fracture of the spine.

Personal life
Ryan is the son of former Dunfermline Athletic player Kevin Hegarty and the nephew of former Dundee United player and manager Paul Hegarty.

References

External links
Ryan Hegarty on Soccerbase

1976 births
Living people
Scottish footballers
Scottish Football League players
Association football defenders
Livingston F.C. players
Dunfermline Athletic F.C. players
Dundee United F.C. players
Footballers from Edinburgh